Bradford William LePage (February 19, 1876 – December 4, 1958) was a Canadian politician and the 15th Lieutenant Governor of Prince Edward Island.

Born in Rusticoville, Prince Edward Island, LePage owned and operated a general store prior to entering politics. He and his family moved to Charlottetown after his election to the provincial legislature. LePage sold his store to his brother, Garfield LePage, and opened the Lepage Shoe Company which was operated for many years by his son, William Reuel, and his grandsons, Walter B. LePage and Don Wonnacott (Don was the last to own and operate The LePage Shoe Co.).

LePage was first elected as a member of the Liberal Party of Prince Edward Island in the district of  2nd Queens in the 1919 election. He was re-elected in the 1927, 1931, 1935, and the 1939 elections.

He was Lieutenant Governor from October 1, 1939 to May 30, 1945.

On February 24, 1897, he married Harriett Christie. They had two children, William Reuel and Hilda Ruth.

References
 Official Prince Edward Island Government Biography

1876 births
1958 deaths
Lieutenant Governors of Prince Edward Island
People from Queens County, Prince Edward Island